Benjamin Savšek (born 24 March 1987) is a Slovenian slalom canoeist who has competed at the international level since 2002.

He won eight medals at the ICF Canoe Slalom World Championships with two golds (C1: 2017, C1 team: 2022), three silvers (C1: 2014, 2015, C1 team: 2018) and three bronzes (C1: 2013, C1 team: 2014, 2015). He also won 11 medals at the European Canoe Slalom Championships (7 golds, 1 silver and 3 bronzes). Savšek was the World No. 1 in the C1 event in 2015.

At the 2012 Summer Olympics he competed in the C1 event where he finished in 8th place. He finished in 6th place in the same event four years later at the 2016 Summer Olympics in Rio de Janeiro. At the 2020 Summer Olympics in Tokyo, he further improved in the C1 event by winning gold.

World Cup individual podiums

1 Pan American Championship counting for World Cup points

References

External links

Slovenian male canoeists
1987 births
Living people
Canoeists at the 2012 Summer Olympics
Canoeists at the 2016 Summer Olympics
Canoeists at the 2020 Summer Olympics
Medalists at the 2020 Summer Olympics
Medalists at the ICF Canoe Slalom World Championships
Olympic canoeists of Slovenia
Olympic gold medalists for Slovenia
Olympic medalists in canoeing
Sportspeople from Ljubljana